Bob Hodges may refer to:

 Bob Hodges (ice hockey)
 Bob Hodges (speed skater)